Tešedíkovo is a village and municipality in Šaľa District, in the Nitra Region of south-west Slovakia.

Geography
The village lies at an altitude of 115 metres and covers an area of 22.785 km².

History
In historical records the village was first mentioned in 1237. After the Austro-Hungarian army disintegrated in November 1918, Czechoslovak troops occupied the area, later acknowledged internationally by the Treaty of Trianon. Between 1938 and 1945 Tešedíkovo once more  became part of Miklós Horthy's Hungary through the First Vienna Award. From 1945 until the Velvet Divorce, it was part of Czechoslovakia. Since then it has been part of Slovakia.

Population
It has a population of about 3,704 people. The village is about 83% Magyar, 17% Slovak.

Facilities
The village has a pharmacy, a public library a gym and a football pitch. It also has a DVD rental store and cinema.

References

External links
http://www.statistics.sk/mosmis/eng/run.html
http://www.tesedikovo.info
http://www.tesedikovo.sk

Villages and municipalities in Šaľa District
Hungarian communities in Slovakia